Pseudupeneus is a genus of mullid fish native to the Atlantic Ocean and the eastern Pacific Ocean.  These fish inhabit mainly the coastal waters of continental shelves, but can be found in deep waters, as well.

Species
There are currently three recognized species in this genus:

 Pseudupeneus grandisquamis (Gill, 1863) (Bigscale goatfish) 
 Pseudupeneus maculatus (Bloch, 1793) (Spotted goatfish) 
 Pseudupeneus prayensis (Cuvier, 1829) (West African goatfish)

References

Mullidae
Perciformes genera
Marine fish genera
Taxa named by Pieter Bleeker